Jean Roth (born 3 March 1924) is a Swiss former cyclist. He competed in the sprint and tandem events at the 1948 Summer Olympics.

References

External links
 

1924 births
Living people
Swiss male cyclists
Olympic cyclists of Switzerland
Cyclists at the 1948 Summer Olympics
Sportspeople from Le Havre
Cyclists from Normandy